The DTA Dynamic is a series of French double-surface ultralight trike wings, designed and produced by DTA sarl of Montélimar. The wings are widely used on DTA trikes as well as by other ultralight aircraft manufacturers.

Design and development
The Dynamic is a cable-braced, king post-equipped hang glider-style wing designed as a touring wing for two-place trikes. It comes in three sizes.

All members of the series are made from bolted-together aluminum tubing, with its 84% double surface wing covered in Dacron sailcloth. The wing's crosstube is of a floating design and all models have a nose angle of 125° and use an "A" frame weight-shift control bar. It is manufactured by DTA's subcontractor, La société Ellipse.

Variants
Dynamic 450
Dynamic 15
Dynamic 15/430
Dynamic 16/430

Applications
DTA Combo
DTA Evolution
DTA Feeling
DTA Voyageur

Specifications (Dynamic 450)

References

External links

Ultralight trike wings